Deliber Rodríguez Ramírez (born 25 July 1993 in Tamayo, Dominican Republic) is a Spanish Paralympic athlete who competes in short distance running in international elite events. He is a triple World medalist and has competed in the 2016 Summer Paralympics.

Rodríguez Ramírez competes alongside his older brother Dionibel Rodríguez Rodríguez who is also a T20 sprinter, they moved to Madrid when they were both young children. They both competed in the men's 400m T20 at the 2016 Paralympic Games, Deliber finished fifth while Dionibel finished fourth.

References

1993 births
Living people
Athletes from Madrid
Paralympic athletes of Spain
Spanish male sprinters
Spanish male middle-distance runners
Athletes (track and field) at the 2016 Summer Paralympics
Medalists at the World Para Athletics Championships
21st-century Spanish people